All My Life is a 1966 American experimental short film directed by Bruce Baillie. It shows a continuous shot of a fence, soundtracked by Ella Fitzgerald's 1936 debut single "All My Life". Film critic P. Adams Sitney identified it as an early example of what he termed structural film.

Description

The film consists of a single shot that begins panning along a picket fence. As the camera continues to pan, red flowers on the fence are seen. The film ends after the camera angles upward to show a horizontal telephone wire and, finally, a blue sky. It uses "All My Life" by Ella Fitzgerald as its soundtrack.

Production

All My Life was shot during a summer trip Baillie took to Caspar, California. Baillie had been admiring the quality of the sunlight, and while driving back down to San Francisco on the second day, he insisted on stopping so he could film. He used a camera with a telephoto lens, set up on a tripod so he could pan and adjust focus at the same time. Having only one roll of outdated Ansco 16 mm film to use, Baillie practiced the timing first and had a friend call out the minutes as they passed. He filmed All My Life as one continuous shot that ended by angling up into the sky.

Baillie had "All My Life" in mind for the soundtrack because it had been playing at Paul Tulley's cabin where they had been staying. The record player there had a potato sack over its speaker, giving it a scratchy sound that Baillie wanted to use. He completed the film at the Morningstar Commune in Sebastopol, California.

Release
The film was released in 1966 and distributed through Canyon Cinema, a cooperative co-founded by Baillie. When a new internegative was created in 1989, retaining the film's vibrant colors was a key concern. The Kodak 7390 stock that Baillie had used for his prints was no longer available, and to replicate the intense red hues of the flowers, preservationists decided against the cyan correction typically used when transferring to the lower-contrast Kodak 7389. It is now part of Anthology Film Archives' Essential Cinema Repertory collection. A digital transfer was made for All My Lifes home release in 2013, in a DVD collection of some of Baillie's work.

Reception
Film critic Manohla Dargis called All My Life "one of the most perfect films that I've ever seen". P. Adams Sitney identified it as an early example of what he termed structural film, in particular for its monomorphic form and its emphasis on the mechanics of filmmaking tools. Filmmaker Chris Welsby remarked that "it has taken me, quite literally, all my life so far to truly appreciate the simple elegant beauty of this cinematic gem. There is nothing in the film that could be changed for the better." Phil Solomon called it "one of the great works of film art".

Filmmaker Laida Lertxundi cited the camera movement in All My Life as an influence on her 2009 film My Tears Are Dry.

References

External links
 All My Life at Canyon Cinema
 

1960s avant-garde and experimental films
1966 short films
American short films
Films based on songs
Films directed by Bruce Baillie
Films shot in California
One-shot films
1960s English-language films
1960s American films
American avant-garde and experimental films